Charles Ferdinand Pahud (18 April 1803 – 31 August 1873) was the Governor-General of the Dutch East Indies in 1856–1861.

Cinchona pahudiana, the variety of C. calisaya introduced to the Dutch East Indies for cultivation as a source of quinine, was named in his honor.

References

External links
 

1803 births
1873 deaths
Governors-General of the Dutch East Indies
Ministers of Colonial Affairs of the Netherlands
Dutch East India Company people from Amsterdam